Nima Heidari (born March 21, 1985) is a player of the Iranian national hockey team and the Premier League from Gachsaran.

Early life 
Nima Heydari was born on march 21, 1985 in Gachsaran, Iran.  He became the Asian champion with the Iranian national hockey team.

Career 
He is currently active in the Turkish Hockey Premier League team.

Honors 
 Champion and runner-up of 11 Iranian Premier League seasons
 Asian Championship with the national team

References 

Iranian sportspeople
1985 births
Living people
People from Dogonbadan